is a peak in the Hida Mountains range of the Japanese Alps at 2889m, located in Kurobe and Tateyama, Toyama and Ōmachi, Nagano, central Honshu, Japan. It is part of Chūbu-Sangaku National Park and is the second highest peak of the Ushirotateyama mountain range.

References 

Hida Mountains
Chūbu-Sangaku National Park
Mountains of Toyama Prefecture
Mountains of Nagano Prefecture
Japan Alps
Kurobe, Toyama
Tateyama, Toyama
Ōmachi, Nagano
Two-thousanders of Asia